Phillipsia is a genus of fungi in the family Sarcoscyphaceae. There are about 17 species in the genus, which collectively have a widespread distribution in subtropical and tropical areas. The genus was circumscribed by Miles Joseph Berkeley in 1881. The generic name honours Wales-born English botanist William Phillips (1822–1905).

Species

Phillipsia carminea
Phillipsia carnicolor
Phillipsia chardoniana
Phillipsia chinensis
Phillipsia costaricensis
Phillipsia crenulata
Phillipsia crenulopsis
Phillipsia crispata
Phillipsia dochmia
Phillipsia domingensis
Phillipsia gigantea
Phillipsia guatemalensis
Phillipsia hartmannii
Phillipsia kermesina
Phillipsia lutea
Phillipsia minor
Phillipsia olivacea
Phillipsia plicarioides
Phillipsia polyporoides
Phillipsia ranomafanensis
Phillipsia rugospora
Phillipsia straminea
Phillipsia subpurpurea
Phillipsia tetraspora
Phillipsia umbilicata

References

External links

Sarcoscyphaceae
Pezizales genera